Lauer is an unincorporated community in Tobin Township, Perry County, in the U.S. state of Indiana.

History
A post office was established at Lauer in 1930, and remained in operation until it was discontinued in 1945. Minnie A. Lauer served as the postmaster.

Geography

References

Unincorporated communities in Perry County, Indiana
Unincorporated communities in Indiana